The Wake Forest Demon Deacons football statistical leaders are individual statistical leaders of the Wake Forest Demon Deacons football program in various categories, including passing, rushing, receiving, total offense, defensive stats, and kicking. Within those areas, the lists identify single-game, single-season, and career leaders. The Demon Deacons represent Wake Forest University in the NCAA's Atlantic Coast Conference.

Although Wake Forest began competing in intercollegiate football in 1888, the school's official record book does not generally include entries from before the 1940s, as records from before this year are often incomplete and inconsistent.

These lists are dominated by more recent players for several reasons:
 Since the 1940s, seasons have increased from 10 games to 11 and then 12 games in length.
 The NCAA didn't allow freshmen to play varsity football until 1972 (with the exception of the World War II years), allowing players to have four-year careers.
 Bowl games only began counting toward single-season and career statistics in 2002. The Demon Deacons have played in 11 bowl games since this decision (with one in each season since 2016), giving many recent players an extra game to accumulate statistics.
 Wake Forest played in the 2006 and 2021 ACC Championship Games, giving players in both seasons yet another game to accumulate statistics.
 Due to COVID-19 issues, the NCAA ruled that the 2020 season would not count against any football player's athletic eligibility, giving all who played in that season the opportunity for five years of eligibility instead of the normal four.

These lists are updated through Wake's game against Vanderbilt on September 10, 2022.

Passing

Passing yards

Passing touchdowns

Rushing

Rushing yards

Rushing touchdowns

Receiving

Receptions

Receiving yards

Receiving touchdowns

Total offense
Total offense is the sum of passing and rushing statistics. It does not include receiving or returns.

Total offense yards

Touchdowns responsible for
"Touchdowns responsible for" is the official NCAA term for combined rushing and passing touchdowns. It does not include receiving or returns. Wake Forest does not list single-game leaders in this statistic.

Defense

Interceptions

Tackles

Sacks

Kicking

Field goals made

Field goal percentage

References

Wake Forest